Captain James Parrington Gornall DSO (22 September 1899 – 13 November 1983) was an English first-class cricketer. Gornall was a right-handed batsman who bowled right-arm medium pace.

Gornall made his first-class debut in 1921 for the Royal Navy against the Army. In 1922 Gornall played in the same fixture.

Gornall joined Hampshire for 1923 County Championship, making a single appearance for the club against Warwickshire.

Gornall's final first-class match came in 1924 for the Royal Navy against the Army.

Gornall fought in the Second World War with the Royal Navy. Entering the war with the rank of commander, Gornall was promoted to captain in 1941 and placed in command of HMS Orion in 1943. On 14 June 1945 Gornall was awarded the Distinguished Service Order. HMS Orion itself received 13 battle honours, a record only exceeded by one other ship, and matched by two others. Gornall retired from the Royal Navy in 1951.

Gornall died in Lower Froyle, Hampshire on 13 November 1983.

External links
James Gornall at Cricinfo
James Gornall at CricketArchive
James Gornall Naval profile

1899 births
1983 deaths
People from Farnborough, Hampshire
English cricketers
Royal Navy cricketers
Hampshire cricketers
Royal Navy officers
Royal Navy officers of World War II
Companions of the Distinguished Service Order
People from Froyle